is a Japanese voice actress and singer. In August 2013, she took a break from voice acting and singing due to poor health and returned a year later. In February 2017, she announced that she had already changed the agency of Office Anemone.

Filmography

Tsubasa in Angel Tales
Misha Arsellec Lune in Ar Tonelico: Melody of Elemia
Misha Arsellec Lune in Ar Tonelico 2
Gengorou, Nenesha in Ar Tonelico 2
Fubuki Sakuragasaki in Arcade Gamer Fubuki
Izumi Makihara in Ayakashi
Kaorin in Azumanga Daioh
Yuka-chan in Azumanga Daioh
Kunugi-Tan in Binchō-tan
Chako Hasegawa in Cosplay Complex
Mei, Misha Arsellec Lune in Cross Edge
Nemu Asakura in Da Capo
Nemu Asakura in Da Capo Second Season
Tsukasa in Daphne in the Brilliant Blue
Masuda Shizuka in Final Approach
Nana in Forza! Hidemaru
Satoka Tachikawa in Gate Keepers 21
Yukina in Girls Bravo
Aihara Nana in KimiKiss: Pure Rouge
Cidre (Episode 01) in Jing: King of Bandits
Arisugawa Yui, Sakaki Mizuki in Lovely Idol
Ayumi Mamiya in Magikano
Rokka Wan in Mamotte! Lollipop
Philomel Hartung in Mana Khemia: Alchemists of Al-Revis
Tarisa Manandal in Muv-Luv Alternative: Total Eclipse
Shiho Munakata in My-HiME
Shiho Huit in My-Otome
Kuriko in Nanaka 6/17
Hiroko Kaizuka (Episode 04, 11, 13) in Naru Taru
Manaka / Yongo (Episode 3 & 10) in Narue no Sekai
Michiko Takane in Otome wa Boku ni Koishiteru
Cha Chi in Penguin Musume Heart
Kaoru Mitarai in Pita Ten
Cinccino in Pokémon
Nono (Episode 8) in Popotan
Ma in Pugyuru
Kasugano Ray in Ray the Animation
Miyuki Onizuka in Real Bout High School
Aki-chan in RockMan.EXE (MegaMan NT Warrior)
Hinaichigo in Rozen Maiden
Hinaichigo in Rozen Maiden Ouvertüre
Hinaichigo in Rozen Maiden Träumend
Hinaichigo in Rozen Maiden: Zurückspulen
White Iris in Rune Factory Frontier
Tsubasa in Saint Beast
Saishi (Episode 18, 21, 22) in Samurai Deeper Kyo
Edomae Lunar in My Bride is a Mermaid
Okuwaka Tsubomi in Strawberry Panic!
Erica Hartmann in Strike Witches
Erica Hartmann in Strike Witches 2
Erica Hartmann in Strike Witches: 501st Joint Fighter Wing Take Off!
Erica Hartmann in Strike Witches: Road to Berlin
Peridot Hamilton in Tales of Hearts
Nene Hampden in Tristia of The Deep Blue Sea
Io Sakuragawa in True Tears
Computer Voice in Ultra Maniac
Nene Mikumo in Venus Versus Virus
Young Ishizu Ishtar in Yu-Gi-Oh! Duel Monsters
Leonie Pinelli in Fire Emblem Three Houses, Fire Emblem Warriors: Three Hopes, Fire Emblem Heroes
Liseto Lander in Atelier Annie: Alchemists of Sera Island
Asuka Hina in Memories Off 5: Togireta Film, Memories Off 5 the Animation
Female Fighter in Granado Espada (Japanese version)

Discography

Singles
 2001-08-01: Soyokaze no Rondo
 2002-01-26: Heart no Puzzle
 2002-08-07: Hoshi no Furu Oka
 2003-07-24: SAKURA Magic ~shiawase ni narou~
 2004-10-27: Kimiiro Palette — anime television series Final Approach opening theme
 2004-12-01: Joyeux Noël ~seinaru yoru no okurimono~ 2006-01-25: Motto! — anime television series Magikano opening theme
 2006-10-04: Dual Love on the planet ~Hanoka~ — anime television series Hanoka opening theme
 2006-11-? : Install Your Heart - anime television series Mega Man Star Force (anime) opening theme
 2008-10-22: Eternal Memory - Radio drama Thor Code opening theme
 2009-?-?: Party Play - anime television series Arad Senki: Slap Up Party 1st opening theme
 2009-?-?: Sokujin no Pandora - anime television series Arad Senki: Slap Up Party 2nd opening theme
 2010-01-29: Last Stop 2010-07-28: Heavenly DaysAlbums
 2003-02-05: SAITA 2004-03-01: U.La.Ra 2005-03-24: PoTeChi 2005-08-03: Cherries — character & theme song best
 2006-04-12: Tenohira no naka no Lupica 2007-08-01: Kazeiro Renpu 2010-08-25: Happy HarmonicsLive
 2010-11-14: Live Tour 2010 ~Happy Harmonics~

References

External links
 Official profile at Office Anemone 
 
 
 Sakura Nogawa at GamePlaza-Haruka Voice Acting Database 
 Sakura Nogawa at Hitoshi Doi's Seiyuu Database

1978 births
Living people
People from Toyohashi
Japanese voice actresses
Musicians from Aichi Prefecture
Anime musicians